The following outline is provided as an overview of and topical guide to electronics:

Electronics – branch of  physics,  engineering and technology dealing with  electrical circuits that involve active semiconductor components and associated passive interconnection technologies.

Branches

Classical electronics
 Analog electronics
 Digital electronics
 Electronic instrumentation
 Electronic engineering 
 Microelectronics
 Optoelectronics
 Power electronics
 Printed electronics
 Semiconductor technology
 Schematic capture
 Thermal management
 Automation Electronics

Advanced topics
 Atomtronics
 Bioelectronics
 Failure modes of electronics
 Flexible electronics
 Low-power electronics
 Microelectromechanical systems (MEMS)
 Molecular electronics
 Nanoelectronics
 Organic electronics
 Photonics
 Piezotronics
 Quantum electronics
 Spintronics

History of electronics
 History of electronic engineering
 History of radar
 History of radio
 History of television

General concepts

Data converters
 Analog-to-digital converters (ADC)
 Aliasing 
 Successive approximation ADC
 Dual-slope ADC
 Quantization
 Sensor resolution
 Sampling
 Sigma–delta ADC
 Digital-to-analog converters (DAC)
 Digital potentiometer 
 Binary weighted resistor converter
 Charge distribution DAC
 Pulse width modulator
 Reconstruction filter
 The R2R ladder

Digital electronics
 Binary decision diagrams
 Boolean algebra
 Combinational logic
 Counters (digital)
 De Morgan's laws
 Digital circuit
 Formal verification
 Karnaugh maps
 Logic families
 Logic gate
 Logic minimization
 Logic simulation
 Logic synthesis
 Registers
 Sequential logic
 State machines
 Truth tables
 Transparent latch

Electrical element/discretes
 Passive elements:
 Capacitor
 Inductor
 Memristor
 Resistor
 Transformer
 Active elements:
 Diode
 Zener diode
 Light-emitting diode
 PIN diode
 Schottky diode
 Avalanche diode
 Laser diode
 Microcontroller
 Operational amplifier
 Thyristor
 DIAC
 TRIAC
 IGBT
 Transistor
 Bipolar transistor (BJT)
 Field effect transistor (FET)
 Darlington transistor
 Other components
 Aural devices
 Battery (electricity)
 Crystal oscillator
 Electromechanical devices
 Sensors
 Surface acoustic wave (SAW)

Electronics analysis
 Electronic packaging
 Electronic circuit simulation
 Electronic design automation
 Electronic noise
 Mathematical methods in electronics
 Thermal management of electronic devices and systems

Electronic circuits
 Amplifiers
 Differential amplifiers
 Feedback amplifiers
 Power amplifiers
 Comparators
 Converters
 Filters
 Active filters
 Passive filters
 Digital filters
 Oscillators
 Phase-locked loops
 Timers

Electronic equipment
 Air conditioner
 Central heating
 Clothes dryer
 Computer/Notebook
 Dishwasher
 Freezer
 Home robot
 Home entertainment system
 Information technologies
 Cooker
 Microwave oven
 Refrigerator
 Robotic vacuum cleaner
 Tablet
 Telephone
 Television
 Water heater
 Washing machine

Electronic instrumentation
 Ammeter 
 Capacitance meter 
 Distortionmeter 
 Electric energy meter 
 LCR meter 
 Microwave power meter 
 Multimeter 
 Network analyzer 
 Ohmmeter 
 Oscilloscope 
 Psophometer 
 Q meter 
 Signal analyzer 
 Signal generator 
 Spectrum analyzer 
 Transistor tester 
 Tube tester 
 Wattmeter 
 Vectorscope 
 Video signal generator 
 Voltmeter 
 VU meter

Memory technology
 Flash memory
 Hard drive systems
 Optical storage
 Probe Storage
 Programmable read-only memory
 Read-only memory
 Solid-state drive (SSD)
 Volatile memory

Microcontrollers
 Features
 Analog-to-digital converter
 Central processing unit (CPU)
 Clock generator (Quartz timing crystal, resonator or RC circuit)
 Debugging support
 Digital-to-analog converters
 Discrete input and output bits
 In-circuit programming
 Non-volatile memory (ROM, EPROM, EEPROM or Flash)
 Peripherals (Timers, event counters, PWM generators, and watchdog)
 Serial interface (Input/output such as serial ports (UARTs))
 Serial communications (I²C, Serial Peripheral Interface and Controller Area Network)
 Volatile memory (RAM)
 8-bit microcontroller families:
AVR - PIC - COP8 - MCS-48 - MCS-51 - Z8 - eZ80 - HC08 - HC11 - H8 - PSoC

 Some notable suppliers: 
ARM 
Atmel 
Cypress Semiconductor
Freescale 
Intel
MIPS
Microchip Technology 
NXP Semiconductors
Parallax Propeller
PowerPC 
Rabbit 2000 
Renesas RX, V850
Silicon Laboratories 
STMicroelectronics 
Texas Instruments
Toshiba TLCS

Optoelectronics

 Optical fiber
 Optical properties
 Optical receivers
 Optical system design
 Optical transmitters

Physical laws
 Ampère's law
 Coulomb's law
 Faraday's law of induction/Faraday-Lenz law
 Gauss's law
 Kirchhoff's circuit laws
 Current law
 Voltage law
 Maxwell's equations
 Gauss's law
 Faraday's law of induction
 Ampère's law
 Ohm's law

Power electronics
 Power Devices
 Gate turn-off thyristor
 MOS-controlled thyristor (MCT)
 Power BJT/MOSFET
 Static induction devices
 Electric power conversion
 DC to DC
 DC to DC converter
 Voltage stabiliser
 Linear regulator
 AC to DC
 Rectifier
 Mains power supply unit (PSU)
 Switched-mode power supply
 DC to AC
 Inverter
 AC to AC
 Cycloconverter
 Transformer
 Variable frequency transformer
 Voltage converter
 Voltage regulator
 Power applications
 Automotive applications
 Capacitor charging applications
 Electronic ballasts
 Energy harvesting technologies
 Flexible AC transmission systems (FACTS)
 High frequency inverters
 HVDC transmission
 Motor controller
 Photovoltaic system Conversion
 Power factor correction circuits
 Power supply
 Renewable energy sources
 Switching power converters
 Uninterruptible power supply
 Wind power

Programmable devices
 Application-specific integrated circuit (ASIC)
 Complex programmable logic device (CPLD) 
 Erasable programmable logic device (EPLD)
 Simple programmable logic device (SPLD)
 Macrocell array
 Programmable array logic (PAL)
 Programmable logic array (PLA)
 Programmable logic device (PLD)
 Field-programmable gate array (FPGA)
 VHSIC Hardware Description Language (VHDL)
 Verilog Hardware Description Language
 Some notable suppliers:
Altera - Atmel - Cypress Semiconductor - Lattice Semiconductor - Xilinx

Semiconductors theory
 Properties
Bipolar junction transistors
Capacitance voltage profiling
Charge carrier
Charge-transfer complex
Deep-level transient spectroscopy
Depletion region
Density of states
Diode modelling
Direct band gap
Electronic band structure
Energy level
Exciton
Field-effect transistors
Metal–semiconductor junction
MOSFETs
N-type semiconductor
Organic semiconductors
P–n junction
P-type semiconductor
Photoelectric effect
Quantum tunneling
Semiconductor chip
Semiconductor detector
Solar cell
Transistor model
Thin film
Tight-binding model
 Device Fabrication
Semiconductor device fabrication
Semiconductor industry
Semiconductor consolidation

Applications
 Audio electronics
 Automotive electronics
 Avionics
 Control Systems
 Consumer electronics
 Data acquisition
 E-health
 Electronic book
 Electronics industry
 Electronic warfare
 Embedded systems
 Home automation
 Integrated circuits
 Marine electronics
 Microwave technology
 Military electronics
 Multimedia
 Nuclear electronics
 Open hardware
 Radar and Radionavigation
 Radio electronics
 Terahertz technology
 Video hardware
 Wired and Wireless Communications

See also 

 Outline of electrical engineering

References

External links 

 
Electronics
Electronics